Webster Samuel Lewis (September 1, 1943 – November 20, 2002) was an American jazz and disco composer, arranger and keyboardist.

Career
Lewis was born in 1943 in Baltimore, Maryland. At a young age, his family encouraged him to take up music. Later, he earned a bachelor's degree in sociology from Morgan State University and then completed a master's degree at the New England Conservatory of Music with Gunther Schuller as his mentor. He started out in jazz working with drummer Tony Williams, George Russell, Bill Evans, Stanton Davis, and the Piano Choir. His first release was Live at Club 7, issued in 1972. He signed with Epic Records in 1976 and began releasing disco music, where he found commercial success. He had several charting singles including 1977's "On the Town/Saturday Night Steppin' Out/Do It with Style" (U.S. Club Play #36) and 1980's "Give Me Some Emotion" (U.S. #107, R&B Singles #41).

Lewis worked extensively as a session musician and studio arranger, for Herbie Hancock, Barry White (he also toured with both of them), and others. He also produced for such artists as Gwen McCrae and Michael Wycoff. He later branched into soundtrack work for film and television, including for the films The Hearse (1980), Body and Soul (1981) and My Tutor (1983).

He also taught jazz voice and arrangement classes at Howard University in Washington as a visiting professor from 1995 to 1999.

Lewis died at his home in Barryville, New York, on November 20, 2002, as a result of pneumonia and diabetes.

Discography

Albums

With The Piano Choir
 Handscapes (Strata-East, 1973)
 Handscapes 2 (Strata-East, 1975)

Singles

References

External links

1943 births
2002 deaths
American jazz organists
American male organists
American disco musicians
20th-century American musicians
The Tony Williams Lifetime members
20th-century organists
20th-century American male musicians
American male jazz musicians
Morgan State University alumni
New England Conservatory alumni